HMS Bombay was a 74-gun third rate ship of the line of the Royal Navy, launched on 28 March 1808 at Deptford.

On 24 January 1813 Bombay, then under the command of Captain Norman Thompson, detained the Dumpteur des Ondts.. She went on to be flagship of Rear-Admiral Sir John Beresford from July 1814, and of Sir Charles Penrose in 1816.

Bombay was renamed HMS Blake in 1819 in honour of Admiral Robert Blake, and was converted to harbour service in 1828. 

She was broken up in December 1855.

Notes, citations, and references

Notes

Citations

References

 
 Lavery, Brian (2003) The Ship of the Line - Volume 1: The development of the battlefleet 1650-1850. Conway Maritime Press. .
 

 

Ships of the line of the Royal Navy
Courageux-class ships of the line
1808 ships